Derrick Dewayne Douglas (born August 10,1968) is a former American football running back who played in the National Football League for two seasons. He played college football at Louisiana Tech and was drafted by the Tampa Bay Buccaneers in the sixth round of the 1990 NFL Draft.

College career
Douglas played at Louisiana Tech for four seasons, from 1986 to 1989. In his junior and senior seasons, Douglas saw significant playing time at running back. In 1988, as a junior, Douglas also saw action as a kick returner for the Bulldogs. In 1989, after rushing for 1,232 yards and 11 touchdowns in his senior season, Douglas was named an honorable mention All-American. Douglas is tenth all-time in rushing yards and fifth all-time in single season rushing yards for Louisiana Tech.

College statistics

Professional career
Douglas was drafted by the Tampa Bay Buccaneers in the 1990 NFL Draft, but did not see the field in his one season with the team. The following season, Douglas played in two games for the Cleveland Browns, though he failed to record a statistic.

References

External links
 Pro Football Archives bio

1968 births
Living people
Sportspeople from Louisiana
Players of American football from Louisiana
American football running backs
Louisiana Tech Bulldogs football players
Cleveland Browns players
Tampa Bay Buccaneers players
People from Lafayette, Louisiana